Val Robinson is the name of

 Val Robinson (baseball) (1848–1898), Major League Baseball player
 Val Robinson (athlete) (born 1940), New Zealand middle-distance runner in 1969 Pacific Conference Games
 Val Robinson (field hockey) (1941–2022), English hockey player